Gábor Erős (born 1 July 1980) is a Hungarian football manager and a former midfielder. He is the assistant manager of Kisvárda.

Coaching career
Erős was appointed caretaker manager of Kisvárda on 10 November 2021, following the dismissal of João Janeiro. On 24 December 2021, he was confirmed as manager on a permanent basis. 

On 28 June 2022, László Török was hired as a new head coach and Erős was appointed his assistant.

References

External links

1980 births
Living people
Hungarian footballers
Association football midfielders
Győri ETO FC players
Budapest Honvéd FC players
Pécsi MFC players
Ferencvárosi TC footballers
Panthrakikos F.C. players
Ionikos F.C. players
PFC Lokomotiv Plovdiv players
Doxa Drama F.C. players
Gyirmót FC Győr players
Kisvárda FC players
Nemzeti Bajnokság I players
Nemzeti Bajnokság II players
First Professional Football League (Bulgaria) players
Hungarian expatriate footballers
Expatriate footballers in Greece
Expatriate footballers in Bulgaria
Expatriate footballers in Cyprus
Hungarian expatriate sportspeople in Greece
Hungarian expatriate sportspeople in Bulgaria
Hungarian expatriate sportspeople in Cyprus
Hungarian football managers
Kisvárda FC managers
Nemzeti Bajnokság I managers
Sportspeople from Győr